Yui Kamiji defeated Sabine Ellerbrock in the final, 7–5, 6–4 to win the women's singles wheelchair tennis title at the 2017 French Open.

Marjolein Buis was the defending champion, but was defeated by Kamiji in the semifinals.

Seeds

Draw

Finals

References
 Draw

Wheelchair Women's Singles
French Open, 2017 Women's Singles